The Essex Reporter is a free American weekly paper that is centered on Essex, Vermont. The Reporter also covers many other Vermont towns and cities such as, Jericho, Underhill and Winooski - with limited drops in Williston. The paper is a part of O'Rourke Media Group.

In January 2021, the paper ceased its weekly print publication and moved to only publish content online.

History
The Essex Reporter is owned and published by Jim O'Rourke, who also owns the Sun in Colchester, Vermont and who own several other Vermont newspapers. 

Before ending print publication, its circulation was estimated at 8,800 papers.

References

External links 
 The Essex Reporter's Website

Newspapers published in Vermont
Weekly newspapers published in the United States